Cătălin Iulian Dedu (born 16 May 1987 in Braşov) is a Romanian football player.

External links
 

1987 births
Living people
Romanian footballers
FC Brașov (1936) players
FC Universitatea Cluj players
Liga I players
Association football forwards
Sportspeople from Brașov